Luc Sonor (born 15 September 1962) is a French former footballer who played as a centre-back. His clubs include CS Sedan Ardennes, FC Metz, AS Monaco and Ayr United.

Club career 
Sonor won the Coupe de France twice, once with AS Monaco and once with FC Metz. He also won the French Championship with Monaco where he played under Arsène Wenger.

Sonor ended his career with Scottish club side Ayr United.

International career 
Sonor collected nine France national team caps including a 2-0 defeat to Scotland at Hampden Park, Glasgow on 8 March 1989. Mo Johnston scored both goals.

Post-playing career
Sonor later worked as technical coach at Saint-Étienne.

Honours 
Metz
 Coupe de France: 1984

Monaco
 Ligue 1: 1988
 Coupe de France: 1991

External links 
 Player profile at the official web site of the French Football Federation
 ASSE Profile
 
  
 Profile – AS Monaco
 Career stats

Living people
1962 births
French people of Guadeloupean descent
French footballers
Guadeloupean footballers
Association football defenders
France international footballers
Ligue 1 players
CS Sedan Ardennes players
FC Metz players
AS Monaco FC players
Ayr United F.C. players
SR Colmar players
French expatriate footballers
French expatriate sportspeople in Scotland
Expatriate footballers in Scotland
Expatriate footballers in Réunion